Yehuda Ben-Haim (29 September 1955 – 5 March 2012) was an Israeli boxer. He competed in the light flyweight event at the 1984 Summer Olympics. At the 1988 Summer Olympics he had a first-round bye. His second-round match, however, fell on Yom Kippur, and he refused to compete. As a result, Ben-Haim was disqualified and eliminated from the tournament.

References

1955 births
2012 deaths
Light-flyweight boxers
Israeli Jews
Jewish boxers
Olympic boxers of Israel
Boxers at the 1984 Summer Olympics
Boxers at the 1988 Summer Olympics
Israeli male boxers
20th-century Israeli people